Tuanku Tambusai Stadium is a football stadium in Bangkinang, Riau, Indonesia.

History
The stadium is named after a national hero from the region Tuanku Tambusai.

Other uses
PSBS Bangkinang use this stadium for their home games. For the 2013 Indonesia Super League season because of financial problems, PSPS Pekanbaru used this stadium as an alternative for using the largerRumbai Stadium.

It was also used as one of the venue for the 2012 Pekan Olahraga Nasional.

References

External links
 Stadium detail

Football venues in Indonesia
Buildings and structures in Riau